The Eagles–Falcons rivalry is a National Football League (NFL) rivalry between the Philadelphia Eagles and the Atlanta Falcons. The rivalry first emerged when the Falcons rallied in the fourth quarter against the Eagles in the 1978 Wild Card Round, and only intensified further in the 2000s with the emergence of star dual-threat quarterbacks in Donovan McNabb and Michael Vick.

History
As of 2021, the Eagles lead the all-time series 21–15–1, and have a 3–1 playoff record. The Eagles were the Falcons' second-ever opponent in the latter's inaugural 1966 season. In that game, Philadelphia won 23–10 as Atlanta went on to finish their first season at 3–11. It was not until 1978, however, that the rivalry truly took off.

1978 Wild Card Round
The Falcons finished the 1978 season 9–7, earning their first-ever playoff berth. Their reward was a home playoff game against the Eagles in the Wild Card Round. The Falcons initially trailed 13–0, but rallied to win 14–13. The turning point of the game came when Falcons quarterback Steve Bartkowski launched a deep pass to wide receiver Wallace Francis, who simultaneously caught the ball with Eagles defender Herm Edwards. Under NFL rules, Atlanta maintained possession following the simultaneous catch, gaining 49 yards in the process. Bartkowski later connected with tight end Jim Mitchell for a 20-yard touchdown, followed by a 37-yard touchdown pass to Francis late in the fourth quarter. Falcons kicker Tim Mazzetti scored the extra point to give Atlanta the lead. Philadelphia punter Mike Michel, who was thrust into kicking duties after a late-season injury to placekicker Nick Mike-Mayer, missed a potential game-winning 34-yard field goal, and was cut soon after..

2000s: Donovan McNabb vs. Michael Vick
Both the Eagles and Falcons would meet almost frequently over the next several years, but in the early 2000s, the rivalry was reignited with the arrival of Donovan McNabb and Michael Vick. The two mobile quarterbacks met for the first time in the 2002 Divisional Round. However, the game failed to live up to the billing, as the Eagles defense sacked Vick (274 passing yards, 30 rushing yards) three times and forced two interceptions, including a 39-yard touchdown return by Bobby Taylor. Meanwhile, McNabb finished with 247 passing yards, 24 rushing yards and a touchdown as Philadelphia won 20–6.

McNabb and Vick would meet once more in the 2004 NFC Championship Game, but the result again favored the Eagles in a 27–10 blowout victory. While McNabb had 180 passing yards, 32 rushing yards and two touchdowns (both were thrown to tight end Chad Lewis), Vick only managed 136 passing yards and 26 rushing yards. Vick was also sacked four times and intercepted twice.

McNabb had defeated Vick in each of their first two meetings, but in Week 1 of the 2005 season, Vick finally bested McNabb in a meaningful contest. In the Monday Night Football opener (the series' final season with ABC until 2020), the Falcons defeated the Eagles 14–10, with Vick scoring the game's first touchdown on a seven-yard run. Overall, the two quarterbacks faced each other in only three of a possible five times during their respective tenures with the Eagles and Falcons. In , Vick missed the Eagles–Falcons game due to a leg injury he suffered in the preseason; the Eagles won 23–16.

Following a dog-fighting scandal and a 21-month prison sentence, Vick was released by the Falcons after the 2008 season. The Eagles eventually signed Vick prior to the 2009 season, and in his first game in Atlanta with the Eagles, Vick scored two touchdowns while serving as McNabb's backup in the Eagles' 34–7 rout. Vick eventually reclaimed the starting job during the 2010 season after McNabb was traded to the Washington Redskins.

Recent years
After releasing Vick, the Falcons groomed Matt Ryan, a Philadelphia native, whom they chose with the third pick in the 2008 NFL Draft, as its new starter. In the 2011 season, Ryan and Vick faced each other for the first time as starting quarterbacks. Vick's second return in Atlanta did not go well, as he suffered a concussion and left the game. Ryan's four touchdowns helped the Falcons defeat the Eagles 35–31, his first career victory over Philadelphia. It was also Atlanta's first win in Philadelphia since .

The Eagles and Falcons would not meet again until the Kickoff of the 2015 NFL season under the Monday Night Football lights. A new look Eagles led by QB Sam Bradford and third-year coach Chip Kelly against Matt Ryan and new Falcons coach Dan Quinn. Despite a 20–3 lead mounted by the Falcons going into halftime, the Eagles came back and took the lead midway in the 4th Quarter with a Ryan Mathews rushing TD that gave the Eagles a narrow 24–23 lead. However, the Falcons drove down the field and regained the lead with a Matt Bryant field goal. The Falcons defense sealed the win with a Ricardo Allen interception off of Bradford.   This would eventually be the Eagles last visit to the Georgia Dome as the stadium was replaced by the Mercedes-Benz Stadium in 2017.

The two teams would meet again the following season with the 6-3 Falcons, sporting a high-flying Falcons offense led by Matt Ryan and Julio Jones, going up against a 4-4 Eagles team now led by the rookie QB-coach tandem of 2016 second overall pick Carson Wentz and Doug Pederson. Despite the Falcons being favorites entering the game, the Eagles mostly held them in check and didn't allow them to score a touchdown until the 4th quarter, when Matt Ryan found receiver Taylor Gabriel for a 76-yard TD pass to take a 15–13 lead (Matt Bryant missed the extra point after). However, the Eagles answered with 11 unanswered points and held on for a 24–15 upset win. 

The Eagles and Falcons resumed their playoff rivalry in the 2017 Divisional Round. The Falcons entered the contest as the defending NFC champions, while the Eagles were the top seed in the NFC. Despite being home underdogs, the Eagles managed to win 15–10 after stopping the Falcons on a goal-line stand in the final minute. Foles passed for 246 yards, while Ryan ended up with 210 passing yards and a touchdown. The game's key points were scored by Eagles kicker Jake Elliott, who scored three consecutive field goals after the Eagles trailed 10–9 in the second quarter.

A rematch took place in the form of the 2018 NFL Kickoff Game. Much like their playoff meeting the previous year, the Eagles defense stopped yet another potential Falcons' game-winning touchdown in an 18–12 victory. Eagles running back Jay Ajayi scored the game-winning touchdown late in the fourth quarter, and the Eagles broke up a potential Ryan touchdown pass to Julio Jones on the final play following an illegal contact on fourth down gave the Falcons one additional play. 

The Eagles and Falcons met again in Week 1 the  season, but this time it was Ryan with new head coach Arthur Smith (who replaced Dan Quinn after a 5 year run with the franchise) against a young and rebuilding Eagles team led by 2nd year quarterback Jalen Hurts and new head coach Nick Sirianni. In the team's first meeting at Mercedes-Benz Stadium, the Eagles dominated the game from start to finish en route to a 32–6 win over the Falcons.

Game results

|-
| 
| style="| Eagles  23–10
| Franklin Field
| Eagles  1–0
| Falcons' inaugural season.
|-
| 
| style="| Eagles  38–7
| Atlanta–Fulton County Stadium
| Eagles  2–0
| 
|-
| 
| style="| Falcons  27–3
| Franklin Field
| Eagles  2–1
|
|-

|-
| 
| Tie  13–13
| Franklin Field
| Eagles  2–1–1
| First and only tie game in the series.
|-
| 
| style="| Falcons  44–27
| Veterans Stadium
| Tied  2–2–1
| 
|-
| 
|style="|Eagles  14–13
| Atlanta–Fulton County Stadium
| Eagles  3–2–1
| 
|-
! 1978 playoffs
!style="| Falcons  14–13
! Atlanta–Fulton County Stadium
! Tied  3–3–1
! NFC Wild Card Round. Falcons' first playoff game. Only playoff game between the two teams to take place in Atlanta.
|-
| 
|style="| Falcons  14–10
| Veterans Stadium
| Falcons  4–3–1
| Falcons take first lead in the series.
|-

|-
| 
| style="| Falcons  20–17
| Veterans Stadium
| Falcons  5–3–1
| Eagles lose Super Bowl XV.
|-
| 
| style="|Eagles  16–13
| Veterans Stadium
| Falcons  5–4–1
| 
|-
| 
|style="|Eagles  28–24
| Atlanta–Fulton County Stadium
| Tied  5–5–1
| 
|-
| 
|style="| Falcons  26–10
| Atlanta–Fulton County Stadium
| Falcons  6–5–1
| 
|-
| 
| style="|Eagles  
| Veterans Stadium
| Tied  6–6–1
| 
|-
| 
| style="|Eagles  16–0
| Atlanta–Fulton County Stadium
| Eagles  7–6–1
| 
|-
| 
|style="| Falcons  27–24
| Veterans Stadium
| Tied  7–7–1
| 
|-

|-
| 
| style="|Eagles  24–23
| Atlanta–Fulton County Stadium
| Eagles  8–7–1
| 
|-
| 
| style="| Falcons  28–21
| Georgia Dome
| Tied  8–8–1
| 
|-
| 
|style="|Eagles  33–18
| Georgia Dome
| Eagles  9–8–1
| 
|-
| 
|style="| Falcons  20–17
| Georgia Dome
| Tied  9–9–1
| 
|-
| 
|style="| Falcons  17–12
| Georgia Dome
| Falcons  10–9–1
| Falcons lose Super Bowl XXXIII. 
|-

|-
| 
|style="|Eagles  38–10
| Veterans Stadium
| Tied  10–10–1
| First start in the series for Donovan McNabb.
|-
! 2002 playoffs
!style="|Eagles  20–6
! Veterans Stadium
! Eagles  11–10–1
! NFC Divisional Round. First start in the series for Michael Vick.
|-
| 
|style="|Eagles  23–16
| Georgia Dome
| Eagles  12–10–1
| Vick missed the game due to injury.
|-
! 2004 playoffs
!style="|Eagles  27–10
! Lincoln Financial Field
! Eagles  13–10–1
! NFC Championship Game. Eagles lose Super Bowl XXXIX.
|-
| 
|style="| Falcons  14–10
| Georgia Dome
| Eagles  13–11–1
| Michael Vick's only head-to-head victory over Donovan McNabb in the Eagles–Falcons rivalry, as well as the only regular season meeting. Vick would later defeat McNabb as an Eagle in  against the Redskins, but it marked the final meeting between the two quarterbacks. McNabb defeated Vick in three of five matchups all-time.
|-
| 
|style="|Eagles  24–17
| Lincoln Financial Field
| Eagles  14–11–1
| McNabb missed the game due to injury.
|-
| 
|style="|Eagles  27–14
| Lincoln Financial Field
| Eagles  15–11–1
| First start in the series for Matt Ryan. Only meeting between Donovan McNabb and Matt Ryan.
|-
| 
|style="|Eagles  34–7
| Georgia Dome
| Eagles  16–11–1
| Michael Vick's first game in Atlanta since joining the Eagles. Final start in the series for Donovan McNabb. Only game in the rivalry in which McNabb and Vick were teammates. Chris Redman started the game for the Falcons in place of an injured Matt Ryan.
|-

|-
| 
| style="|Eagles  31–17
| Lincoln Financial Field
| Eagles  17–11–1
| Kevin Kolb started the game for the Eagles in place of an injured Michael Vick.
|-
| 
| style="| Falcons  35–31
| Georgia Dome
| Eagles  17–12–1
| First-ever meeting between Michael Vick and Matt Ryan. Ryan's first victory against the Eagles.
|-
| 
| style="| Falcons  30–17
| Lincoln Financial Field
| Eagles  17–13–1
| Final start in the series for Michael Vick. Falcons' first win in Philadelphia since 1988.
|-
| 
| style="| Falcons  26–24
| Georgia Dome
| Eagles  17–14–1
|
|-
| 
| style="|Eagles  24–15
| Lincoln Financial Field
| Eagles  18–14–1
| First of two meetings between Matt Ryan and Carson Wentz in the rivalry. Falcons lose Super Bowl LI.
|-
! 2017 playoffs
! style="|Eagles  15–10
! Lincoln Financial Field
! Eagles  19–14–1
! NFC Divisional Round. First of two meetings between Matt Ryan and Nick Foles in the rivalry. First postseason game in which a #1 seed is an underdog in the Divisional Round. Eagles win Super Bowl LII.
|-
| 
| style="|Eagles  18–12
| Lincoln Financial Field
| Eagles  20–14–1
| NFL Kickoff Game. Last of two meetings between Matt Ryan and Nick Foles in the rivalry.
|-
| 
| style="| Falcons  24–20
| Mercedes-Benz Stadium
| Eagles  20–15–1
| Last of two meetings between Matt Ryan and Carson Wentz in the rivalry. 
|-

|-
| 
| style="|Eagles  32–6
| Mercedes-Benz Stadium
| Eagles  21–15–1
| Head coaching debut for both coaches, Nick Sirianni for Philadelphia and Arthur Smith for Atlanta. Final start in the series for Matt Ryan.
|-

|-
| Regular season
| style="|
| Eagles 9–6–1
| Eagles 9–8
| 
|-
| Postseason
| style="|
| Eagles 3–0
| Falcons 1–0
| NFC Wild Card Round: 1978. NFC Divisional Round: 2002, 2017. NFC Championship Game: 2004
|-
| Regular and postseason 
| style="|
| Eagles 12–6–1
| Tied 9–9
| 
|-

See also
 National Football League rivalries

Notes and references

National Football League rivalries
Philadelphia Eagles
Atlanta Falcons
Philadelphia Eagles rivalries
Atlanta Falcons rivalries